Kent D. Syverud is the 12th Chancellor and President of Syracuse University. He began his term of office on January 13, 2014.

Education and early career 
Syverud earned a bachelor's degree magna cum laude from Georgetown University School of Foreign Service in 1977, a law degree magna cum laude from the University of Michigan Law School in 1981, and a master's degree in economics from the University of Michigan in 1983. 
At Michigan, he was awarded the Henry M. Bates Memorial Scholarship, the Abram W. Sempliner Memorial Award, the Joel D. and Shelby Tauber Scholarship Award, and the Clifton M. Kolb Law Scholarship, and was elected to the Order of the Coif.
After graduating from law school, Syverud clerked for U.S. District Judge Louis F. Oberdorfer. Syverud counts among his closest mentors retired U.S. Supreme Court Justice Sandra Day O'Connor, for whom he clerked shortly after she became the first woman named to the Supreme Court bench.

Professor of law 
From 1987 to 1997, Syverud taught complex litigation, insurance law, and civil procedure at Vanderbilt University and at the University of Michigan Law School, where he earned tenure in 1992 and advanced to Associate Dean for Academic Affairs in 1995. Syverud served as Dean of the Vanderbilt University Law School from 1997 to 2005, where he was the Garner Anthony Professor of Law. Under Syverud, the law school underwent a $24 million facility expansion that more than doubled its size and the number of faculty grew from 33 to 47 members.

Syverud served as Dean of the Washington University School of Law from 2005-2013, where he was also the Ethan A. H. Shepley Distinguished University Professor in 2005.

Syracuse University Chancellor and President 
On September 12, 2013, Syverud was named the 12th Chancellor and President of Syracuse University, succeeding Nancy Cantor. He formally took office as Chancellor on January 13, 2014, and was inaugurated on April 11, 2014.

Public service 

In addition to his higher education leadership, Syverud previously served as co-chair of the Central New York Regional Economic Development Council, part of a statewide network created by New York Governor Andrew Cuomo to help spur economic growth throughout the state. Under his leadership, plan submitted by central New York council was selected for an Upstate Revitalization Initiative grant of $500 million.

He also previously served as one of two independent trustees of the Deepwater Horizon Oil Spill Trust., a $20 billion fund to pay claims arising from the 2010 BP oil spill in the Gulf of Mexico. In 2016 he completed six years of service as one of the two trustees of the $20 billion Deepwater Horizon Oil Spill Trust.

He has previously served as a Commissioner for the Middle States Commission on Higher Education  and as Chair of the Law School Admissions Council.

Syverud currently serves as the chair of the Atlantic Coast Conference (ACC) Board of Directors. He serves on the boards of The Commission on Independent Colleges and Universities in New York, SUNY College of Environmental Science and Forestry (ex-officio), Crouse Hospital and the Boy Scouts of America Longhouse Council.

See also 
List of law clerks of the Supreme Court of the United States (Seat 8)

References 

Law clerks of the Supreme Court of the United States
Washington University in St. Louis faculty
Vanderbilt University faculty
Vanderbilt University Law School faculty
University of Michigan faculty
Walsh School of Foreign Service alumni
Deans of law schools in the United States
Year of birth missing (living people)
Living people
University of Michigan Law School alumni
People from Irondequoit, New York
Presidents of Syracuse University